The Evelyn Hone College of Applied Arts and Commerce is the largest of the Technical Education and Vocational Training (TEVET) institutions under the Ministry of Higher Education in Zambia.  It is a quasi-government college, third-largest in the country only to the University of Zambia and Copperbelt University.

Information       
Originally known as the Evelyn Hone College of Further Education, the college was officially opened in October 1963, by Evelyn Dennison Hone, the last Governor of Northern Rhodesia.

The college is currently run by a management board in accordance with the provisions of the TEVET Act No. 13 of 1998. 

Mission - To provide quality training in applied arts, commerce, science, and technology in order to increase the pool of highly skilled personnel, enhance their employability, and contribute to economic diversification.

Organization
Evelyn Hone College is divided into the following faculties:

School of Humanities and Social Sciences
Development Studies
Economics
History
Political and Administrative Studies
Population Studies
Psychology
Philosophy and Applied Ethics
Media and Communication Studies (formerly Mass Communication)
Literature and Language
Gender Studies
Social Work and Sociology

Graduate School of Business
Business Administration
Masters in Business Administration

Alumni
 Eddie Amkongo
 George Chellah
 Tresford Himanansa II
 Dickson Jere
 Godfrey Miyanda
 Mulenga Mulenga
 Henry Joe Sakala
 Paul Shalala
 Lily Tembo
 Agnes Yombwe

References

1963 establishments in Northern Rhodesia
Educational institutions established in 1963
Universities and colleges in Zambia